Oberwelland is a surname. Notable people with the surname include:

 Axel Oberwelland (born 1966), German billionaire businessman, owner of confectionery manufacturer August Storck
 August Oberwelland, German entrepreneur and founder of company August Storck